Ervin Õunapuu (born 30 July 1956 in Käru, Rapla County) is an Estonian writer, playwright, stage designer and filmmaker.

1987–1990, he was the stage designer at Rakvere Theatre. Since 1990, he is a freelancer.

In 2000, he was awarded with Friedebert Tuglas short story award.

Selected works
 novel "Olivia meistriklass" ('Olivia. Master Class'), FC Boheem 1996
 collection of short stories  "Eesti gootika", Varrak 1999
 "Teie mälestuseks, kes iganes te olete ja kus asute", Umara 1999
"Surmaminejad lasevad tervitada", Umara 2000
"Väike palveraamat", Umara 2000
"Mõõk", Umara 2002
"Sinu teejuht ristiusku", Umara 2003
"Eesti gootika II", Umara 2004
"Öövöö", Sirp 2004

References

1956 births
Living people
Estonian male writers
Estonian dramatists and playwrights
20th-century Estonian writers
21st-century Estonian writers
People from Türi Parish